Music from Vanilla Sky is the soundtrack to the 2001 film Vanilla Sky. The album has been subject to critical acclaim from its reviewers, being called "a music masterpiece" by The New York Times. The eclectic taste of the soundtrack has been said to be one of the reasons the movie has become a cult classic. The eponymous song from the soundtrack, written by Paul McCartney, was nominated for an Academy Award for Best Original Song.

Track listing

Additional songs
"From Rusholme with Love" by Mint Royale
"My Robot" by Looper
"My Favorite Things" by John Coltrane
"Keep On Keeping On" by Curtis Mayfield
"Wrecking Ball" by Creeper Lagoon
"Earthtime Tapestry" by Spacecraft
"Indra" by Thievery Corporation
"Loops of Fury" by The Chemical Brothers
"Rez" by Underworld
"Too Good to Be True" by Two Sandwiches Short of a Lunchbox and Andrea Parker
"One of Us" by Joan Osborne
"I Might Be Wrong" by Radiohead
"Wild Honey" by U2
"Jingle Bell Rock" by Bobby Helms
"Western Union" by Five Americans
"You Know You're Right" by Nirvana
Cameron Crowe revealed in 2020 that Courtney Love gave him the then-unreleased song to hide in his movie somewhere.
"Heaven" by The Rolling Stones
"Good Vibrations" by The Beach Boys
"Summer's End" by Elmer Bernstein
"The Healing Room" by Sinéad O'Connor
"Njósnavélin (The Nothing Song)" by Sigur Rós. 
The version used in the movie is from a never-released concert which took place in Denmark in 2000.
"Doot-Doot" by Freur
"Ladies and Gentlemen, We Are Floating in Space" by Spiritualized
"Ágætis Byrjun" by Sigur Rós

Year-end charts

References

External links

Albums produced by Bob Ezrin
Albums produced by Bob Johnston
Albums produced by David Kahne
Albums produced by Paul McCartney
Albums produced by Todd Rundgren
Albums produced by Scott Litt
2001 soundtrack albums
Albums produced by Cameron Crowe